Major general David Douglas Wemyss (1760–1839) was a British Army officer. Born Douglas, he changed his name to Wemyss circa 1790.

He was the seventh General Officer Commanding, Ceylon, appointed in 1804. He was succeeded by Thomas Maitland.

At Tottenham in December 1810, he married Elizabeth Tuckett, daughter of Elias Tuckett and Sarah Merchant, of Bath. He was at the time Governor of Tynemouth Castle and Cliffe Fort, having been appointed to the position in May 1809.  He had a son by a previous marriage.

References

1760 births
1839 deaths
General Officers Commanding, Ceylon
British Army major generals
49th Regiment of Foot officers
British Army personnel of the American Revolutionary War
Buffs (Royal East Kent Regiment) officers
37th Regiment of Foot officers
British Army personnel of the French Revolutionary Wars
Royal Irish Regiment (1684–1922) officers
Burials at Kensal Green Cemetery